Shibu  is a 2019 Indian Malayalam-language film directed by duo directors Arjun and Gokul, written by Praneesh, and produced by Kaargo Cinemas. It features Karthik, Anju Kurian, Salim Kumar, and Biju Kuttan in lead roles. Sachin Warrier composed the music for the film. It was released on 19 July 2019.

Plot 
Shibu is a young guy from a small town who is an aspiring film maker. He tries hard to achieve his dreams, but gets rejected by all. Then he hears about a film institute and he manages to convince his family to let him join the institute. There, instead of learning about cinema, he gets confused. He quits the film institute and tries to make a zero budget film casting his brother in law as the hero and chooses supporting actors from random people he meets. But the shoot goes wrong and turns into chaos and an actor is accidentally killed by Shibu. Then he desperately tries to cover up the murder. Meanwhile, he meets with a girl named Kalyani in a match-making meet and how their aspirations brings them together forms the rest of the story.

Cast 

 Karthik Ramakrishnan as Shibu
 Anju Kurian as Kalyani
 Salim Kumar as Dr. Thomas
 Biju Kuttan as Prahladhan
 Lukman Lukku as Habeeb
Vinod kovoor as Producer
Unni Rajan P Dev as Antappan
Sneha as Kalyanis friend
 Aiswarya Padmakumar as Suhara
Rajesh Sharma as Satheesh Kupleri
Kannan Sagar as Bhuvanan
Badra as Shibu's Mom
Kshama Krishnan as Sheeba
Sharan as Siddique
Sundarpandiyan as Police Officer
 Kochu Preman as Eastman Narayanan
Naseer Samkranthi as Kambikaadu
Abhirami as Sandhya
Gopika as Suhara's Friend
Anagha as Kalyani's Friend
Roslyn as Short film actress
Shyni Sara as Kalyani's mother
Janish Jinu as Kuttan
Jaleel as Jaleel
Ajith as Suhail
Rajesh Paravoor as Attender
Pavithran as Police Constable
Rajesh Panavalli as Marriage Broker
Gokul Ramakrishnan as Cameo appearance in the title song

Production
The film has music by Sachin Warrier. Sachin wrote about it, "‘Omal Kanmani’ composed by Bijibal sir from the 2015 movie ‘32aam Adhyayam 23aam Vaakyam’ is a song that's close to heart among the ones I’ve sung so far. The directors of the movie, Arjun and Gokul came to me to narrate a story recently, and I had a lot of fun listening to it. I believe it'll turn out to be an interesting film. Super happy to associate with Arjun and Gokul, as a composer in their second film" said Sachin Warrier. Arun Gopi director of Dileep starer movie Ramaleela released first look poster of the film in April 2019. Actor Dileep released trailer of the film in June 2019.

Soundtrack 

Lyrics are written by Manu Manjith and Vinayak Sasikumar, all music is composed by Sachin Warrier and Vignesh Baskaran.

Release 
The film was released on 19 July 2019 across 80 screens in Kerala.

Critical Reception 
The film received mixed reviews, with 2.5 stars out of 5 from Anandh Vishnu of Samayam, while Deepika Jayaram in Times of India gave it 2 stars out of 5, criticising the story and the actors' performances.

References

External links 

 

2010s Malayalam-language films
Films scored by Sachin Warrier
Indian romantic comedy-drama films
Indian action comedy-drama films
2019 films
2010s action comedy-drama films
2019 romantic comedy-drama films